Doamna Stanca National College may refer to one of two educational institutions in Romania:

Doamna Stanca National College (Făgăraș)
Doamna Stanca National College (Satu Mare)